Colonel General  Vitéz Dezső László (23 July 1894, Lovászpatona, – 8 June 1949, Budapest) was a captain during World War I and general during World War II. He was executed by the People's Republic of Hungary in 1949.

Awards 
 Iron Cross (1939) 2nd and 1st Class
 Knight's Cross of the Iron Cross (3 March 1945)

References

Citations

Bibliography

External links
Generals.dk

1894 births
1949 deaths
People from Veszprém County
Hungarian generals
Recipients of the Knight's Cross of the Iron Cross
Executed Hungarian collaborators with Nazi Germany
Executed military leaders